Mark V. Shoen (born 1951) is an American billionaire businessman and vice-president of the moving equipment and storage rental company U-Haul, which was founded by his father. Shoen is also the largest shareholder in its parent company, Amerco.


Early life
Shoen was born in Phoenix the son of Leonard Shoen and Anna Carty.

Career
Shoen is the largest shareholder in Amerco, the parent company of U-Haul, which is North America’s biggest moving and storage company.

According to Forbes, Shoen has a net worth of $2.7 billion, as of October 2020.

Personal life
Shoen is married with one child and lives in Phoenix, Arizona.

References 

1951 births
Living people
American billionaires
Businesspeople from Phoenix, Arizona
Shoen family